Brandon Orlando Tatum is an American conservative political commentator, former police officer and former college football player.

Early life and education  
Born in Fort Worth, Texas, Tatum was an All-American football player in high school. His father, Bobby Tatum, was a captain in the Fort Worth Fire Department. His great uncle, Jack Tatum, was an Ohio State All-American, NFL All-Pro, and a Super Bowl champion with the Oakland Raiders   Tatum was featured in the US-Army All-American Game, which showcases the top 78 high school football players in the nation. Tatum committed to playing on a full athletic scholarship from the University of Arizona in 2004. Tatum played at Arizona for five years and entered the NFL Draft in 2010.

Career

Police officer 
After going undrafted in the NFL Draft, Tatum became a police officer in Tucson, Arizona. He rose to prominence in early 2016 for a viral video which featured him at a campaign rally for presidential candidate Donald Trump. Following the rally, he said in the video that he felt unsafe because of those who protested against the event. He went viral a second time in September 2017 for a video in which he expressed his opposition to players "taking the knee" during the national anthem at NFL football games.

Political commentary 

Tatum resigned from the Tucson Police Department in October 2017 to join Liftable Media — a conservative content producer that owns and operates The Western Journal and The Conservative Tribune. He then served as director of urban engagement for the conservative action group Turning Point USA, before founding his own media company in late 2019.

He runs a YouTube channel called "The Officer Tatum" with over 2.18 million subscribers.  As of December 2022, he has accumulated over 463 million total views.

Tatum has also appeared as a guest on Candace Owens's PragerU show The Candace Owens Show as well as her The Daily Wire political podcast Candace as a panelist.

Blexit
Along with Owens, Tatum founded Blexit, an organization meant to persuade the black American population to leave the Democratic Party. The name Blexit is a combination of the words "black and "exit".

In May 2022, Tatum began hosting a national talk radio program, The Officer Tatum Show, distributed by Salem Radio Network.

Bibliography
Beaten Black and Blue, published November 30, 2021

References

External links
 The Officer Tatum
 Tatum Report
 

1987 births
African-American Christians
African-American police officers
American Christians
American columnists
American gun rights activists
American media critics
American police officers
American political commentators
American political writers
American YouTubers
Arizona Republicans
Black conservatism in the United States
Commentary YouTubers
Living people
News YouTubers
People of African-American descent
People from Fort Worth, Texas
University of Arizona alumni
YouTubers from Texas
YouTube channels launched in 2016
YouTube podcasters